George Papas (born March 15, 1998) is a Greek–American professional basketball player for Olympiacos of the Greek Basket League and the EuroLeague. He is a  shooting guard.

Early life
Papas was born in Jersey City, New Jersey, to Alexis Maloney and Greek-born Stefanos Papathanasiou.
He has a brother  years his elder named Tommy, currently a player for Mykonos in the Greek B Basket League and formerly for William & Mary.

College career

He reached the 1,000-point plateau for the Hawks in February against Marist.
He also competed in the Dos Equis 3X3U 3-on-3 competition at the 2022 Final Four, the first Hawk ever selected to the event.

Professional career
On August 14, 2022, he singed his first professional contract, for 
EuroLeague powerhouse Olympiacos.

In October 2022, he celebrated the first title of his professional career, which was the Super Cup, in the Final 4 of Rhodes.

On October 10, 2022, he made his debut in the Greek Basket League, in the away match against Apollon Patras. He contributed 6 points, one rebound and one assist in 10 minutes of action in his team's 61–87 victory.

In December 12, 2022, Papas made his EuroLeague debut in the home game win against Fenerbahçe, playing 2:51 minutes and scoring 2 points.

In February 2023, he won another title with Olympiakos, that of the Greek Cup in the Final 8 of Crete.

International career
On November 7, 2022, Papas was called up for the first time by Greece for the 2023 World Cup qualifi,ers against Latvia and Belgium, without making an appearance. 
He was called up again for the last two qualifiers on February. He made his debut against Serbia on February 24, 2023, using his full surname on his jersey (Papathanasiou).
Three days later against Latvia he scored his first points. A three-point shot.

References

External links
FIBA Profile
Euroleague.net Profile
Olympiacosbc.gr Profile
sports-reference.com Profile
basketball.eurobasket.com
ESPN

1998 births
Living people
American people of Greek descent
Basketball players from New Jersey
Sportspeople from Jersey City, New Jersey
Greek men's basketball players
American men's basketball players
Union Catholic Regional High School alumni
College men's basketball players in the United States
Monmouth Hawks men's basketball players
American expatriate basketball people in Greece
Greek Basket League players
Olympiacos B.C. players
Shooting guards